Tobacco Induced Diseases is a peer-reviewed open access medical journal covering all aspects of the adverse health effects of tobacco use. It was established in 2002 and is published by the International Society for the Prevention of Tobacco Induced Diseases, of which it is the official journal. Between 2007-2017 it was published by BioMed Central on behalf of the society. As of January 2018, the journal is again published directly by the society. The editors-in-chief are James Elliott Scott (University of Manitoba) and Israel Agaku (U.S. Centers for Disease Control and Prevention and Harvard School of Dental Medicine).

Abstracting and indexing
The journal is abstracted and indexed in:
Chemical Abstracts Service
CINAHL
Current Contents/Social & Behavioral Sciences
Embase
Science Citation Index Expanded
Scopus
Social Sciences Citation Index

According to the Journal Citation Reports, the journal has a 2016 impact factor of 2.092.

References

External links

Tobacco control journals
Publications established in 2002
English-language journals
Continuous journals